{{DISPLAYTITLE:C13H24N4O3S}}
The molecular formula C13H24N4O3S (molar mass: 316.42 g/mol, exact mass: 316.1569 u) may refer to:

 Bupirimate
 Timolol

Molecular formulas